Serapias lingua, commonly known as tongue-orchid or the tongue Serapias, is a species of orchid native to the Mediterranean.

Habitat and distribution
Serapias lingua can be found in damp meadows and open fields of Portugal, Spain, Malta, France, Italy, Yugoslavia, Albania, Greece and all the Mediterranean islands west of Crete and in western North Africa.

Flowering
Serapias lingua flowers in spring to early summer with 2.5 cm flowers and then they go dormant in mid and late summer.

References

External links 

lingua
Plants described in 1753
Taxa named by Carl Linnaeus
Orchids of Europe
Flora of Malta